Siab or SIAB may refer to:

 Ship in a bottle, a type of impossible bottle
 Siab-e Darvish (also Sīāb), a village in Gachi Rural District, Malekshahi County, Ilam Province, Iran
 Sirab (also Siab), a village and municipality in the Babek Rayon of Nakhchivan, Azerbaijan
 SIAB: Shell in a Box, Web-based SSH